Jarkovac is a village in Serbia. It is situated in the Sečanj municipality, Central Banat District, Vojvodina province. The village has a Serb ethnic majority (76.27%), with Hungarian (8.69%) and Romanian (5.72%) minorities. Its population was 1,817 people in the 2002 census.

Name

In Hungarian, the name of the village is Árkod. In German the name is Jarkowatz.

Historical population

1961: 2,963
1971: 2,624
1981: 2,291
1991: 2,155
2002: 1,817

Ethnic groups
In 1910, there were 3,019 people living in Jarkovac: 2,602 Serbians, 313 Germans, 54 Hungarians, 14 Romanians, 6 Croatians, 4 Slovaks and 26 others.

See also
List of places in Serbia
List of cities, towns and villages in Vojvodina

References
Slobodan Ćurčić, Broj stanovnika Vojvodine, Novi Sad, 1996.

Populated places in Serbian Banat
Populated places in Central Banat District
Sečanj